Clifford Charles Norton (March 21, 1918 – January 25, 2003) was an American character actor and radio announcer who appeared in various movies and television series over a career spanning four decades.

Early years 
Norton was born in Chicago, and grew up there, graduating from Senn High School. His early jobs included selling shoes and working as a floorwalker. His first broadcasting experience came as a disc jockey at a radio station there. During World War II he was a bombardier in the U.S. Army Air Corps.

Career
Norton was probably best known as the announcer for Dave Garroway's radio program. He also appeared on an episode of The Dick Van Dyke Show (Season 2, Episode 11) as a game warden sent out to nab a woodpecker terrorizing Richie in "A Bird in the Head Hurts" .

On old-time radio, Norton was a member of the cast of Terry and the Pirates. On television, he was a regular on Your Show of Shows, Sid Caesar Presents Comedy Preview, Garroway at Large, Caesar's Hour and The Dave Garroway Show. He was also a regular panelist and presenter on the 1954 ABC game show What's Going On?.

In 1952 he appeared as himself on the short-lived NBC comedy series The Public Life of Cliff Norton, which aired five minutes a night, five nights a week at 11:10 p.m. Eastern Time. He was also star and announcer for the 1960s syndicated program The Funny Manns, which involved silent film footage used for broad comedic effect.

Norton appeared in a two episodes of The Cara Williams Show in 1964 and 1965 and had a regular role in the 1966–1967 sitcom It's About Time as "Boss", the chief of a prehistoric caveman tribe which has been discovered by two American astronauts who have accidentally traveled back in time.

He played Captain Kurtz on Hogan's Heroes (Season 2, Episode 23.) He played Police Chief Harris in a 1964 episode of The Munsters ("A Walk on the Mild Side"), dressing in drag to capture a purse snatcher in the local park. Norton also made several appearances on Bewitched between 1968 and 1970, and in the 1967 The Monkees episode "The Picture Frame." He also provided the voice for the lead character, Ed Huddles, in Hanna-Barbera's 1970 animated prime-time series Where's Huddles?

In 1971, he appeared in the final episode of Green Acres as Harry Grant, devout gambler and brother-in-law of Oliver's dizzy blonde former secretary Carol Rush (Elaine Joyce). The episode was a backdoor pilot for a sitcom that CBS later rejected.

One of Norton's film roles was Charlie, the Bailiff in The Ghost and Mr. Chicken (1966) starring Don Knotts. He also appeared in Kiss Me, Stupid (1964), Harlow (1965), Munster, Go Home! (1966), The Russians Are Coming, the Russians Are Coming (1966), Suppose They Gave a War and Nobody Came (1970), Harry and Tonto (1974), Funny Lady (1975), and all-star comedy films such as It's a Mad, Mad, Mad, Mad World (1963) and Won Ton Ton, the Dog Who Saved Hollywood (1976).

He appeared in the spoofing weather spot Your Weather and Mine, airing in the Los Angeles area in 1963. The spot was sponsored by P.I.P.E.

In 1977, he appeared in "Never Con a Killer," the pilot for the ABC crime drama The Feather and Father Gang, and in the episode "Godfathers Five" of the ABC situation comedy The San Pedro Beach Bums.  He played small-time thief Morrie Singer in the episode "To Stop A Steele" from the first season of the NBC series Remington Steele, airing in 1983.

Death
On January 25, 2003, Norton died at his home in Studio City, California at age 84.  He was survived by three children and four grandchildren.

Filmography

References

External links

1918 births
2003 deaths
20th-century American male actors
American male film actors
American male radio actors
American male television actors
American male voice actors
Male actors from Chicago
People from Studio City, Los Angeles
Radio and television announcers
United States Army Air Forces personnel of World War II